Finley Tapp (born 9 November 1999) is an English television personality and former semi-professional footballer.

In 2020, Tapp won the sixth series of the ITV2 reality series Love Island. Prior to appearing on the show, Tapp was a semi-professional football player for non-league club Oxford City, having previously played as a professional for Milton Keynes Dons.

Club career

Milton Keynes Dons
Tapp joined Milton Keynes Dons' academy at the age of 8, progressing through various age groups and into the club's development squad. On 10 November 2016, whilst still an academy player, Tapp was named as a substitute for the first team's EFL Trophy group stage fixture against Norwich City. After coming on as a 76th-minute substitute, Tapp scored in the 84th-minute in an eventual 4–1 defeat.

Tapp signed professional terms with the club on 17 May 2018, signing a one-year deal with an option of a further year. He made his professional debut for the club on 28 August 2018, coming on as a second-half substitute in a 3–0 EFL Cup second round defeat away to Premier League side Bournemouth. Following limited first team opportunities during the first half of the 2018–19 season, Tapp joined seventh-tier club Staines Town until January 2019. Tapp was later one of ten players released by Milton Keynes Dons at the end of the season.

Oxford City
On 19 July 2019, following a successful trial, Tapp joined National League South club Oxford City.

Media career

Love Island
In January 2020, it was announced that Tapp would join the sixth series of ITV2 dating programme Love Island, the first series to feature a winter villa, located in Cape Town, South Africa. Tapp entered the villa on Day 5.

On 23 February 2020, Tapp along with fellow participant Paige Turley were voted the show's winning couple by the UK public and shared a £50,000 prize. Tapp contested the show without permission from Oxford City, which the club's commercial director said though there was no formal breach of contract, but to avoid such situations, the club will introduce formal clauses inhibiting appearances on TV shows for players in future contract forms.

Celebrity Coach Trip
In January 2022, Tapp alongside partner Paige Turley featured in the seventh series of E4's Celebrity Coach Trip.

Personal life
Since January 2020, Tapp has been in a relationship with Paige Turley, whom he met during the sixth series of Love Island.

Career statistics

References

Living people
1999 births
People from Milton Keynes
Footballers from Buckinghamshire
English footballers
Association football defenders
Milton Keynes Dons F.C. players
Staines Town F.C. players
Oxford City F.C. players
Southern Football League players
National League (English football) players
English television personalities
Love Island (2015 TV series) contestants